Arno Behrisch (June 6, 1913 – September 16, 1989) was a German politician of the Social Democratic Party (SPD) and former member of the German Bundestag.

Life 
From 1946 to 1949, Behrisch was a member of the Bavarian State Parliament, then of the German Bundestag until 1961.

Literature

References

1913 births
1989 deaths
Members of the Bundestag for Bavaria
Members of the Bundestag 1957–1961
Members of the Bundestag 1953–1957
Members of the Bundestag 1949–1953
Members of the Bundestag for the Social Democratic Party of Germany
Members of the Landtag of Bavaria